Segestes is a genus of bush crickets in the subfamily Mecopodinae and tribe Sexavaini.

Species can be found in Australasia.

Species
The Catalogue of Life lists:
Segestes beieri Kästner, 1934
Segestes brevipennis Willemse, 1977
Segestes celebensis Karny, 1931
Segestes cornelii Willemse, 1977
Segestes decoratus Redtenbacher, 1892
Segestes frater Hebard, 1922
Segestes fuscus Redtenbacher, 1892
Segestes grandis Willemse, 1955
Segestes punctipes Redtenbacher, 1892
Segestes stibicki Willemse, 1977
Segestes unicolor Redtenbacher, 1892
Segestes vittaticeps Stål, 1877 - type species

References

Mecopodinae
Orthoptera genera
Orthoptera of Australia